Aldgate is a London Underground station near Aldgate in the City of London. It is in Travelcard Zone 1.

Aldgate was opened in 1876 with its entrance on Aldgate High Street. A station named  opened nearby eight years later and is served today by the District and Hammersmith & City lines.

History 
However, this change also forced an awkward doubling-back at Aldgate, reducing the desirability of the line for local traffic and greatly increasing the cost of construction due to high prices in the City of London. Construction was also delayed because the station was on the site of a plague pit behind St Botolph's Aldgate which contains an estimated 1,000 bodies.

Aldgate station was opened on 18 November 1876, with a southbound extension to Tower Hill opening on 25 September 1882, completing the Circle (line). Services from Aldgate originally ran further west than they do now, reaching as far as Richmond.

The train shed of 1876 survives, hidden from the street by the later station frontage building erected in 1926. This was designed by Charles Walter Clark the Metropolitan Railway's chief architect between 1911 and 1933.

The station building has a six-bay façade clad in white faïence with original features including 1920s shopfronts with green marble and pink granite stallrisers, a half-hexagonal canopy of glass and metal suspended by elegant metal ties, leaded light first floor windows, dentil cornice, two ornamental lamp brackets and a frieze bearing moulded lettering and the Metropolitan Railway monogram.

Aldgate became the terminus of the Metropolitan line in 1941. Before that, Metropolitan trains had continued on to the southern termini of the East London Line.

In 2005, one of four suicide bombers involved in the 7 July terrorist attacks detonated a device on a C-stock Circle line train from Liverpool Street and was approaching Aldgate. Seven passengers were killed in the bombing. Of the stations affected by the bombings, Aldgate was the first to be reopened, once police had handed back control of the site to London Underground following an extensive search for evidence. Once the damaged tunnel was repaired by Metronet engineers, the lines were reopened. This also allowed the Metropolitan line to be fully restored, since the closure had meant all trains had to be terminated two stations early, at Moorgate.

Services
On the Circle line the typical off-peak service measured in trains per hour (tph) is:
 6 tph clockwise to Edgware Road via ;
 6 tph anti-clockwise to Hammersmith via .

On the Metropolitan line the typical off-peak service in trains per hour is:
 12 tph terminating at Aldgate 

Connections
London Buses routes 15, 25, 42, 78, 100, 115, 135, 205, 242, 254, 343 and night routes N15, N25, N205, N253, N550 and N551 serve the station.

Cultural references

Aldgate station plays a role in the Sherlock Holmes story The Adventure of the Bruce-Partington Plans (published in the anthology His Last Bow).

In the story, the body of a junior clerk named Cadogan West is found on the tracks outside Aldgate, with a number of stolen plans for the Bruce-Partington submarine in his pocket. It seems clear enough that "the man, dead or alive, either fell or was precipitated from a train." But why, wonders Holmes, did the dead man not have a ticket? It turns out that the body was placed on top of a train carriage before it reached Aldgate, via a window in a house on a cutting overlooking the Metropolitan line. Holmes realises that the body fell off the carriage roof only when the train was jolted by the dense concentration of points at Aldgate.

Aldgate is also mentioned in John Creasey's 1955 detective novel Gideon's Day. It has also appeared in two films: Four in the Morning (1965) starring Ann Lynn and Norman Rodway and V for Vendetta (2006), starring Hugo Weaving and Natalie Portman.

Notes and References

Notes

References

External links

London Transport Museum Photographs Collection

Circle line (London Underground) stations
Metropolitan line stations
Tube stations in the City of London
Former Metropolitan Railway stations
Railway stations in Great Britain opened in 1876
Tube station